The white marmoset (Mico leucippe), or golden-white bare-ear marmoset, is a vulnerable species of marmoset, a small monkey endemic to the Amazon rainforest in Pará, Brazil.

References

white marmoset
Mammals of Brazil
Endemic fauna of Brazil
white marmoset
white marmoset